Elections in Malaysia include elections to public office of the political entities that since 1963 have composed the federation of Malaysia. At present, elections in Malaysia exist at two levels: federal level and state level. Federal level elections are those for membership in the Dewan Rakyat, the lower house of Parliament, while state level elections are for membership in the various State Legislative Assemblies. The heads of executive branch at both the federal and state levels, the Prime Minister and Menteri Besar/Chief Ministers respectively, are indirectly elected, usually filled by a member of the majority party/coalition in the respective legislatures.

While any state may dissolve its assembly independently of the Federal Parliament, the traditional practice is for most state assemblies to be dissolved at the same time as Parliament, with the exception of Sabah and Sarawak, although these two states had held elections simultaneously with the rest of the country, as it is the case for Sabah in elections from 2004 to 2018, and Sarawak in the 1969 and 1974 elections. The practice of holding simultaneous elections was disrupted following the 2020–2022 Malaysian political crisis, with only three states holding state elections at the same time as the 2022 parliamentary general election.

Federal level

At the federal level, voters elect the 222-member House of Representatives (literally "Hall of the People") of the bicameral Parliament. Members are elected from single-member constituencies drawn based on population using the first past the post system. The party that has the majority of the House of Representatives will form the federal government.

The Constitution of Malaysia requires that a general election must be held at least once every five years. However, the Prime Minister can ask the Yang di-Pertuan Agong to dissolve the Parliament at any time before this five-year period has expired. A general election should be held no later than 60 days after the dissolution of the Parliament.

Since independence, the parliamentary elections have most often been won by the Barisan Nasional (National Front, abbreviated BN, and its predecessor, the Alliance), a coalition of fourteen parties. The 1969 election saw the first time the Alliance failed to attain a two-thirds majority in Parliament (two-thirds majority being the majority required to pass most constitutional amendments), which happened again in the 2008 and 2013 elections; the latter also saw the BN losing the popular vote while retaining the majority of seats. In the 2018 general elections, the Pakatan Harapan coalition defeated the BN at the federal level for the first time in history.

State level
At the state level, voters elect representatives to the Dewan Undangan Negeri (State Legislative Assembly). The number of representatives varies between the different states, with as many as 82 electorates in Sarawak and as little as 15 in Perlis. Members are elected from single-member constituencies drawn based on population using the first-past-the-post system. The party that forms the majority of the state assembly will form the state government.

State assembly constituencies are smaller in area and population than the parliamentary constituencies. Each parliamentary constituency outside of the federal territories is subdivided into a number of state assembly constituencies, usually two or three but can be as many as six.

Traditionally, state elections are held simultaneously with the parliamentary election but each state can decide when to hold its election. This is because state assemblies are dissolved by their respective Ruler or governor on the advice of the chief minister of the state. For example, following the 1977 Kelantan Emergency, a snap election was called in Kelantan in March 1978, months ahead of the general election in July 1978. A more recent example is that in the 1999 general election, the state elections of the 11 states on Peninsular Malaysia were held simultaneously with the parliamentary election, while Sabah already had its state election months earlier and the Sarawak state assembly was not due for election until 2001. In the 2004 and 2008 general elections, the state election of Sabah were held simultaneously with the parliamentary election as well, but Sarawak held its state election in 2006 and 2011. 

The practice of holding simultaneous elections was disrupted following the 2018 elections and the 2020–2022 Malaysian political crisis. Early state elections took place in Sabah (2020), Malacca (2021) and Johor (2022). Sarawak held its delayed state election in  December 2021. When the 14th Parliament was dissolved on 10 October 2022 to make way for the 15th general election, six out of nine states with elections due in 2023 opted not to dissolve their state assemblies at the same time, leaving only three states (Pahang, Perak and Perlis) holding state elections concurrently with the parliamentary election.

Before the 2008 elections, the Barisan Nasional and its predecessor the Alliance controlled most of the state assemblies in every election, while occasionally losing some states, most notably Kelantan which was controlled by the Pan-Malaysian Islamic Party (PAS) from 1959 to 1978 (the last four years as part of BN) and again since 1990. The worst result for the Alliance was in 1969, when it lost its majority in Perak, Selangor and Penang in addition to Kelantan. In the 2008 elections, in addition to Kelantan, BN lost four states (Penang, Kedah, Perak and Selangor) to the loose coalition of opposition parties (later known as the Pakatan Rakyat (People's Pact, abbreviated PR)) composed of PAS, Democratic Action Party (DAP) and People's Justice Party (PKR). Perak was returned to BN control in 2009 following a constitutional crisis. In the 2013 elections, BN recaptured the state of Kedah, leaving Kelantan, Penang and Selangor in PR control.

Following the 2018 elections, the BN only retained control of the states of Perlis, Pahang and Sarawak. PAS retains Kelantan while capturing Terengganu. The Pakatan Harapan coalition retains control of Penang and Selangor as well as capturing the states of Kedah, Perak, Negeri Sembilan, Melaka and Johor. An informal alliance between Parti Warisan Sabah and Pakatan Harapan also took control of the state of Sabah. BN still remained governing the state of Sarawak, which they won in the state elections held in 2016, until the Sarawak BN parties left the coalition in 2018, thus forming Gabungan Parti Sarawak.

Local government elections
Although there used to be elections for members of local governments such as municipal councils, today, no local government elections are held in Malaysia. Local government elections were suspended after the Indonesia-Malaysia confrontation in 1964. The suspension was never lifted and instead made permanent under the Local Government Act 1976. Under the Act, or the laws of individual states where relevant, local government members are appointed by the state government.

After Minister and People's Progressive Party President M. Kayveas raised concerns about local governments in late 2005, some suggested reviving local government elections. However, in an opinion column, the New Straits Times (owned by the United Malays National Organisation or UMNO, leading party of the Barisan Nasional) quoted a professor from Universiti Kebangsaan Malaysia as saying that such elections would not be brought back because "policymakers know from experience worldwide that the Opposition tends to dominate such councils as part of the electorate's desire for checks-and-balances." The professor also stated that due to required constitutional changes, it would be difficult for such amendments to pass muster in Parliament. The column also quoted a government ministry as saying that "holding elections are expensive affairs".

As of 2008, the Pakatan Rakyat states' governments would like to implement the local government election in their states. However, these was not carried out due to the Federal Constitution which prohibits the implementation. It was only after Pakatan Harapan won the 2018 Malaysian general election that the new government began the process of looking into and reintroducing local elections after 55 years, with a trial run slated for 2019 in select cities.

By-elections

In addition to general elections, a by-election occurs when a particular seat in the Dewan Rakyat becomes vacant.
Such a vacancy can occur when, a member of parliament (MP) dies, and an MP is disqualified from being a member of the Dewan Rakyat; a seat is declared vacant because the MP has been absent from every sitting of the Dewan Rakyat for a period of six month months without leave of the Dewan Rakyat, and the members of the Dewan Rakyat have decided to declare the seat vacant. The exception is if the vacancy occurs when the tenure for the current Parliament or state assembly is less than two years, where the seat is simply left vacant until the next general election.

Electoral district boundaries

It is the role of the Election Commission to draw, review and re-delineate electoral district boundaries. The last delineation was made on 21 March 2003. As of 2013, there are a total of 222 parliamentary districts and 576 state assembly districts in Malaysia. The EC has been accused of practising gerrymandering during delineation exercises.

Under Article 113 of the Constitution of Malaysia, the EC may conduct a review and recommend changes to electoral boundaries at an interval of not less than 8 years from the last review and delineation.

Election process
Elections are supervised by a seven-member Election Commission. Its members are appointed by the Yang di-Pertuan Agong following the advice of the Prime Minister.

Nomination process
Nomination centres are set up in various locations by the Election Commission to allow candidates to register themselves. Typically any Malaysian citizen may register as a candidate unless disqualified. Candidates file the appropriate forms and place a monetary deposit. The deposit was RM5000 to contest a parliamentary seat, or RM3000 to contest a state assembly seat. This amount was changed to RM 10,000 and RM 5,000 respectively in 2004. Additionally in 2004 it was required that each candidate provide a RM 5,000 deposit for cleaning up banners and posters after the election. This increase is seen by some as having led to the government winning a record number of seats without contest in 2004 (17 parliamentary seats were won without contest). The deposit is used to pay for infringements of election laws and is returned after polling day unless the candidate loses and fails to garner more than 1/8 of the vote.

As of the 2004 elections, candidates may have a lawyer present at these proceedings. Some candidates have been disqualified from previous elections as they lacked the competence to fill in the forms correctly.

In 2004 candidates were given 1-hour to fill in and return their nomination forms as opposed to 2 hours previously. This led to disqualification of certain candidates who were unaware of the change.

Campaigning

The campaign period permitted by law runs from the date of nomination day until polling day. Campaigning amongst opposition parties is often hampered by a lack of access to government-controlled media. Prior to the 1999 general election, opposition parties were given a brief period of airtime on the public Radio Television Malaysia (RTM) radio stations to broadcast their manifestoes. However, the government announced a change of policy in 1999, insisting that as RTM was government-owned, preference would be given to government parties.

Election day
On election day, registered voters may cast their ballot for their chosen candidate in a designated voting centre. These voting centres are typically schools or community centres which have been procured for that day. All activities in the school are suspended for that day. Holidays are also declared in states where election day does not fall on a weekend to allow maximum turnout.

Certain political parties will provide transport for voters to and from the voting centre. While campaigning is not allowed on election day, transportation is seen as something of a social service, especially since many people did not have a personal means of conveyance until the last decade or two, as of 2004.

No campaigning or advocacy for candidates is allowed within a voting centre. However, just outside the gate of most voting centres, there will be people plugging the various candidates.

Agents
Each candidate is allowed one agent per voting centre. Their job starts early and begins by inspecting that the metal ballot boxes have not been tampered. They also ensure that the boxes are securely locked before voting begins. After locking, the boxes are sealed by the election commission and each agent may place their own seal on the box.

The agents also ensure that the ballot papers given out to voters do not contain markings. In the past certain parties have marked the ballot papers for their own candidates. This will result in a spoilt vote which is discarded during counting. Some ballot papers have been coated with waxy surfaces to prevent voting for certain candidates. The agents ensure that these events do not occur.

The last task of the agent is to ensure that, on the close of voting, the ballot boxes are still secure and the seals are intact. This may be done at a designated counting centre instead of the voting centre. The boxes are opened once the agents are certain that there is no tampering.

Voting process
Since 15 December 2021, Malaysian citizens 18 years old and above are automatically registered to vote. Voting is not compulsory.

After identity verification at a voting centre, each voter receives two paper ballots, one for the parliamentary seat of the constituency and another for the state assembly seat. In federal territories, where there is no state assembly, and states whose state election is held on a different date, each voter receives only one ballot for the parliamentary seat.

Each voter walks into individual booth to mark ballots while maintaining confidentiality. The voter marks on each ballot the candidate of his or her choice with a cross beside the candidate's name and party symbol. After completing, the voter folds the ballots and drops them into separate ballot boxes for parliamentary and state assembly seats.

Counting and announcement of election results
After the close of voting the election agents check the ballot boxes prior to opening and counting. They also monitor the counting to ensure that the total ballots are the same as the number of votes cast. This extends to checking the number of "double votes". Every ballot paper has a serial number on it and they are given out sequentially. Agents may come to check that the serial numbers match up. The counting of the ballots is done by hand.

After a count at the voting centre the boxes are transported to the counting centre for a second count. If all candidates agree to the count then it stands or else an immediate re-count is done at the counting centre.

Election results are announced through live broadcasts by radio and television stations. Some newspapers print special editions to cover the election results. In most constituencies, the results will be out on the night of the election day. In some rural constituencies and constituencies that need recounts, the results may not be announced until the next day. In recent years, the younger voters have started staying updated with the polling results via social media and news apps.

Election offences
There are a few offences under election law. Most of these pertain to acts which induce a voter to cast his ballot for a candidate. It is also an offence to use these actions to induce voters not to cast ballots at all. These offences extend to using third parties as agents to commit them.

It is an offence to provide food, drinks or refreshments with a view to induce voters to either vote for a particular candidate or not vote at all.
It is illegal to provide monetary rewards for voting for a certain candidate.
It is an offence to threaten a person to vote for a candidate or not to vote. In 2004 this was extended to include "spiritual threats". This was due to the Pan-Malaysian Islamic Party (PAS) told citizens in less developed parts of the country not voting for the PAS is forbidden and that a vote for them would be rewarded by God.
It is an offence to obstruct passage to and from a voting centre. Setting up a location for any candidate within  of the voting centre is an offence. Similarly, loitering in this zone is also an offence. Only voters are allowed in this zone on voting day.
It is technically an offence to provide transportation to a voting centre. However, this is not normally enforced as all parties do this to some degree. It is a further offence to use a vehicle that is normally rented out (such as a taxi or hired bus) to provide such transportation. The only exception to this is that it is allowed to provide for the crossing of rivers. No passengers of any vehicle can be forced to alight within  of a candidate's booth on voting day.
Each candidate is not allowed to spend more than RM 200,000 (parliamentary) or RM 100,000 (state) for campaigning under Section 19 of the Elections Offences Act, 1954.

List of Federal General Elections in Malaya and Malaysia

Latest election

Federal Parliament

State legislative assemblies

Future elections

Dissolution of parliament
The 14th Parliament of Malaysia was dissolved on 10 October 2022. The 15th Malaysian general election (GE15) was held on 19 November 2022. 

The Constitution of Malaysia stipulates that a parliament lasts for five years from the day of its first sitting unless dissolved earlier by the Yang di-Pertuan Agong due to a motion of no-confidence or at the request of the Prime Minister, and a general election must be held no more than 60 days following a dissolution. The first meeting of the first session of the 15th Parliament of Malaysia was held on 19 December 2022, which means the 15th Parliament (if not dissolved earlier) will automatically dissolve on 19 December 2027, and the next general election will be held by 17 February 2028.

The 222 members of the Dewan Rakyat are elected from single-member constituencies using the first-past-the-post voting system. Malaysia does not practice compulsory voting. On 16 July 2019, the Constitution (Amendment) Bill 2019 that
requires a two-thirds majority of at least 148 votes from the 222-seat Dewan Rakyat to lower the voting age to 18 was passed with a total of 211 votes. The 2022 general election was the first to utilize automatic voter registration of all Malaysian citizens aged 18 and above.

The legitimacy of redelineation of electoral boundaries for the entire country are currently under review by the Election Commission (EC), which is under the jurisdiction of the Prime Minister's Department. The redelineation was approved 2 months before GE14, which saw enormous malapportionment between constituencies e.g. in Selangor, Sabak Bernam has 40,000 voters but in Bangi, there are 180,000 voters. Because Article 113 of the Federal Constitution stated that the EC could only conduct a redelineation exercise after eight years from the date of the last exercise or if there was a change in the number of parliamentary seats under Article 46. If the exercise is necessary for the next general election, amendments have to be made to the Federal Constitution and have to be passed with a two-thirds majority in Dewan Rakyat.

Dissolution of state legislative assemblies
Each state may dissolve its assembly independently of the Federal Parliament. In accordance with Malaysian law, the parliament as well as the legislative assemblies of each state (Dewan Undangan Negeri) would automatically dissolve on the fifth anniversary of the first sitting, and elections must be held within sixty days of the dissolution, unless dissolved prior to that date by their respective Heads of State on the advice of their Heads of Government.

Below are the dates of which the legislative assembly of each state would automatically dissolve:

General, State and By-elections

See also
 Electoral calendar
 Electoral system
 List of the winning political parties in the Malaysian general election by parliamentary constituency

Notes

References
 Chin, James. 2002. "Malaysia: The Barisan National Supremacy." In David Newman & John Fuh-sheng Hsieh (eds), How Asia Votes, pp. 210–233. New York: Chatham House, Seven Bridges Press. .
Chow, Kum Hor (8 October 2005). "'Third government' is ratepayers' bugbear". New Straits Times, p. 18.
 Crouch, Harold. 1996. Government and Society in Malaysia. Ithaca, NY; London: Cornell University Press. .

External links
Adam Carr's Election Archive